The Ottawa Braves program is a college football team that represents Ottawa University in the Kansas Collegiate Athletic Conference, a part of the NAIA.  The team has had 28 head coaches since its first recorded football game in 1901. The current coach is Kent Kessinger who first took the position for the 2004 season.

Key

Coaches

See also

 List of people from Franklin County, Kansas

Notes

References
	
	

Lists of college football head coaches

Kansas sports-related lists